Psychiatric Times is a medical trade publication written for an audience involved in the profession of psychiatry. It is published monthly by MJH Associates and is distributed to about 50,000 psychiatrists monthly. The download of the journal is free of charge.

History
The periodical was first published in January 1985 as a 16-page bimonthly publication. It was founded by psychiatrist John L. Schwartz and originally edited by Ronald Pies. The current editor-in-chief is Ronald W. Pies.

References

External links

Psychiatry journals
Publications established in 1985
1985 establishments in the United States